Rashid Behbudov (Azerbaijani Cyrillic: Рашид Бейбутов; 14 December 1915 – 9 June 1989) was a Soviet and Azerbaijani singer and actor.

Rashid Behbudov was born in Tbilisi in 1915. His father, Majid Behbudov, was a singer as well. In 1945, upon the invitation of Tofig Guliyev, Rashid Behbudov moved to Baku. In the same year, he was assigned the main role of Asgar in the film Arshin Mal Alan (The Cloth Peddler), based on a play by Uzeyir Hajibeyov. His role in this film combined with his vocal skills brought him fame throughout Azerbaijan.

In a short time, Behbudov became also prominent Azerbaijani pop singer. His combination of vocal masterpieces ranged from classical performances to lyrical songs. Behbudov's rare vocal talent gave him opportunity to travel beyond the "Iron Curtain" of the Soviet Union, and as a singer he toured with concert performances in several countries of the world, including Iran, Turkey, China, India, Japan, Argentina, and many other countries in Europe, Asia and Latin America.

In 1966, he created the State Song Theater, which still carries his name, and became its soloist and artistic manager.

Honours and awards
 People's Artist of the Azerbaijani SSR
 People's Artist of the USSR (1959)
 Hero of Socialist Labour (23 April 1980)
 Two Orders of Lenin (6 January 1976, 23 April 1980)
 Order of the Red Banner of Labour (1 February 1966)
 Order of Friendship of Peoples (13 December 1985)
 Stalin Prize, 2nd class (1946) – for his role in the film Asker "Arshin Mal Alan" (1945)
 State Prize of the Azerbaijani SSR (1978)

Memory
On 14 December 2010, FLASHMOB Azerbaijan organized a flash mob to memorialize the honor of Rashid Behbudov and to celebrate the 95th jubilee anniversary of the famous representative of Azerbaijani music and culture.

On June 11, 2016, a monument dedicated to him was erected in front of the State Song Theater named after Rashid Behbudov in Baku.

See also
List of People's Artists of the Azerbaijan SSR

Notes

External links
 Listen to Rashid Behbudov, Music Section of Azerbaijan International
 CD series: 
 

1915 births
1988 deaths
Azerbaijani actors
Soviet male actors
People from Tbilisi
Soviet male singers
Azerbaijani singers
Stalin Prize winners
20th-century singers
Georgian Azerbaijanis
Musicians from Tbilisi
Azerbaijani film actors
Azerbaijani male singers
Persian-language singers
20th-century male singers
Burials at Alley of Honor
Soviet Azerbaijani people
Heroes of Socialist Labour
Azerbaijani-language singers
People's Artists of the USSR
Azerbaijani male film actors
People's Artists of the Azerbaijan SSR
Recipients of the Order of Lenin
20th-century Azerbaijani singers
20th-century Azerbaijani male actors
Georgian people of Azerbaijani descent
Recipients of the Order of Friendship of Peoples
Recipients of the Order of the Red Banner of Labour